Nadine E. Velázquez (born November 20, 1978) is an American actress and model known for her roles as Catalina Aruca on My Name Is Earl and Sofia Ruxin on The League. She has also appeared in films such as War (2007), Flight (2012) and Snitch (2013), and was a cast member on the TV series Major Crimes.

Early life
Velázquez was born in Chicago, Illinois. She is of Puerto Rican descent. After graduating from Notre Dame High School for Girls, she earned a Bachelor of Arts in marketing from Columbia College Chicago in 2001. She has a brother named Nelson.

Career
Velázquez has appeared in print ads, television, and film. Her first acting role was a McDonald's commercial as a drive-through lady.
She was originally cast as Fernando Sucre's girlfriend, Maricruz Delgado, in the Fox television series Prison Break but took the role of Catalina Aruca in the NBC series My Name Is Earl instead. Her first film roles were in the movie War with Jet Li and Jason Statham, and in the Oxygen Network original television film Husband for Hire. She was one of the actors in the 2006 monologue show Skirts & Flirts. In 2006, she was named #39 in the annual Maxim Hot 100 list. Velazquez was one of the judges in the Miss Universe 2008 beauty pageant and the host for the Miss USA 2009 pageant.

In 2011 Velazquez appeared in the pilot of ABC's Charlie's Angels as Gloria Martinez, one of Charlie's hired "Angels". Her character was killed off after a few minutes of screen time and was replaced by Minka Kelly. She appeared in a recurring role in FX's fantasy football sitcom The League and on The CW's comedy-drama Hart of Dixie.

In 2012, Velazquez appeared in the movie Flight, playing flight attendant Katerina Marquez, a supporting role opposite the main protagonist character played by Denzel Washington. In 2013, Velazquez reunited with her former My Name Is Earl cast members for a guest appearance in Raising Hope. Velazquez joined the main cast of the TNT series Major Crimes, beginning with season two. She plays Emma Rios, a DA, who is a romantic interest of Raymond Cruz's Julio Sanchez. Cruz played Paco, her boyfriend, on My Name Is Earl.

On March 8, 2021, it was announced that Velazquez was to join the cast of ABC's music series Queens, alongside Brandy, Eve and Naturi Naughton. In May 2021, it was announced the show was being picked up for a full series. On October 1, 2021, the first promo single from Queens (“Nasty Girl")
was released featuring Velasquez alongside the cast: Brandy, Eve, Naughton and Velazquez. A music video, directed by Tim Story, was released on the same day. This was followed on October 18, 2021 by another rap song from the Queens  soundtrack: “The Introduction”, which was co-written by Nas. Queens debuted on October 19, 2021 and reviews were largely positive; Caroline Framke for Variety praised the quartet’s musical offering, calling their raps “sharp and distinct […] making clear their talent as both individuals and a swaggering collective”. Angie Han for The Hollywood Reporter called the show “Impressive […] lavish […] magic”.

Personal life
Velazquez married talent agent Marc Provissiero in 2005. They divorced in 2011.

Filmography

Film

Television

References

External links
 

1978 births
Actresses from Chicago
American film actresses
Female models from Illinois
American television actresses
American people of Puerto Rican descent
Living people
Columbia College Chicago alumni
21st-century American actresses
Hispanic and Latino American actresses